Anthony Liekens (born 12 December 1975) is a Belgian informaticist, biologist, inventor and educator.

Life and career
Liekens obtained his master's in Computer Science at Vrije Universiteit Brussel in 2000 with extra curricular courses at the University of Antwerp. In 2005 his work on photography from Saturn's moon Titan was published.

Liekens operates the Open Garage hackerspace, residing as Belgian national radio's scientist where he shares educational knowledge with the community.

Selected academic works
Most-cited papers:

 2011 — Optimized filtering reduces the error rate in detecting genomic variants by short-read sequencing. Nature biotechnology. According to GoogleScholar, this paper has been cited 183 times.
 2011 — BioGraph: unsupervised biomedical knowledge discovery via automated hypothesis generation. Genome Biology According to GoogleScholar, this paper has been cited 113 times.
 2009 — Molecular circuits for associative learning in single-celled organisms Journal of the Royal Society Interface. According to GoogleScholar, this paper has been cited 91 times.

Personal
Liekens is married to Els De Ketelaere and has 2 children.

In March 2023 he was accused of sexually molesting an 11 year old girl. According to Liekens “a science experiment”.

References

1975 births
Living people
Belgian biologists
Belgian computer scientists